George Pólya (December 13, 1887 – September 7, 1985) was a Hungarian mathematician. He was a professor of mathematics from 1914 to 1940 at ETH Zürich and from 1940 to 1953 at Stanford University. He made fundamental contributions to combinatorics, number theory, numerical analysis and probability theory. He is also noted for his work in heuristics and mathematics education. He has been described as one of The Martians, an informal category which included one of his most famous students at ETH Zurich, John Von Neumann.

Life and works 
Pólya was born in Budapest, Austria-Hungary, to Anna Deutsch and Jakab Pólya, Hungarian Jews who had converted to Christianity in 1886. Although his parents were religious and he was baptized into the Catholic Church upon birth, George eventually grew up to be an agnostic. He received a PhD under Lipót Fejér in 1912, at Eötvös Loránd University. He was a professor of mathematics from 1914 to 1940 at ETH Zürich in Switzerland and from 1940 to 1953 at Stanford University. He remained a Professor Emeritus at Stanford for the rest of his career, working on a range of mathematical topics, including series, number theory, mathematical analysis, geometry, algebra, combinatorics, and probability. He was invited to speak at the ICM at Bologna in 1928, at Oslo in 1936 and at Cambridge, Massachusetts, in 1950.

Death 
On September 7, 1985, Pólya died in Palo Alto, California, United States. He passed due to complications of a stroke he suffered in the past summer.

Heuristics 
Early in his career, Pólya wrote with Gábor Szegő two influential problem books, Problems and Theorems in Analysis (I: Series, Integral Calculus, Theory of Functions and II: Theory of Functions. Zeros. Polynomials. Determinants. Number Theory. Geometry). Later in his career, he spent considerable effort to identify systematic methods of problem-solving to further discovery and invention in mathematics for students, teachers, and researchers. He wrote five books on the subject: How to Solve It, Mathematics and Plausible Reasoning (Volume I: Induction and Analogy in Mathematics, and Volume II: Patterns of Plausible Inference), and Mathematical Discovery: On Understanding, Learning, and Teaching Problem Solving (volumes 1 and 2).

In How to Solve It, Pólya provides general heuristics for solving a gamut of problems, including both mathematical and non-mathematical problems. The book includes advice for teaching students of mathematics and a mini-encyclopedia of heuristic terms. It was translated into several languages and has sold over a million copies. The book is still used in mathematical education. Douglas Lenat's Automated Mathematician and Eurisko artificial intelligence programs were inspired by Pólya's work.

In addition to his works directly addressing problem solving, Pólya wrote another short book called Mathematical Methods in Science, based on a 1963 work supported by the National Science Foundation edited by Leon Bowden and published by the Mathematical Association of America (MAA) in 1977. As Pólya notes in the preface, Bowden carefully followed a tape recording of a course Pólya gave several times at Stanford in order to put the book together. Pólya notes in the preface "that the following pages will be useful, yet they should not be regarded as a finished expression."

Legacy 
There are three prizes named after Pólya, causing occasional confusion of one for another. In 1969 the Society for Industrial and Applied Mathematics (SIAM) established the George Pólya Prize, given alternately in two categories for "a notable application of combinatorial theory" and for "a notable contribution in another area of interest to George Pólya."

In 1976 the Mathematical Association of America (MAA) established the George Pólya Award "for articles of expository excellence" published in the College Mathematics Journal. In 1987 the London Mathematical Society (LMS) established the Pólya Prize for "outstanding creativity in, imaginative exposition of, or distinguished contribution to, mathematics within the United Kingdom." In 1991, the MAA established the George Pólya Lectureship series.

Stanford University has a Polya Hall named in his honor.

Selected publications

Books 
 Aufgaben und Lehrsätze aus der Analysis, 1st edn. 1925. ("Problems and theorems in analysis“). Springer, Berlin 1975 (with Gábor Szegő).
 Reihen. 1975, 4th edn., .
 Funktionentheorie, Nullstellen, Polynome, Determinanten, Zahlentheorie. 1975, 4th edn., .
 Mathematik und plausibles Schliessen.  Birkhäuser, Basel 1988,
 Induktion und Analogie in der Mathematik, 3rd edn.,  (Wissenschaft und Kultur; 14).
 Typen und Strukturen plausibler Folgerung, 2nd edn.,  (Wissenschaft und Kultur; 15).
  –  English translation: Mathematics and Plausible Reasoning, Princeton University Press 1954, 2 volumes (Vol. 1: Induction and Analogy in Mathematics, Vol. 2: Patterns of Plausible Inference)
 Schule des Denkens. Vom Lösen mathematischer Probleme ("How to solve it“). 4th edn. Francke Verlag, Tübingen 1995,  (Sammlung Dalp).
  –  English translation: How to Solve It, Princeton University Press 2004 (with foreword by John Horton Conway and added exercises)
 Vom Lösen mathematischer Aufgaben. 2nd edn. Birkhäuser, Basel 1983,  (Wissenschaft und Kultur; 21).
  –  English translation: Mathematical Discovery: On Understanding, Learning and Teaching Problem Solving, 2 volumes, Wiley 1962 (published in one vol. 1981)
 Collected Papers, 4 volumes, MIT Press 1974 (ed. Ralph P. Boas). Vol. 1: Singularities of Analytic Functions, Vol. 2: Location of Zeros, Vol. 3: Analysis, Vol. 4: Probability, Combinatorics
 with R. C. Read: Combinatorial enumeration of groups, graphs, and chemical compounds, Springer Verlag 1987 (English translation of Kombinatorische Anzahlbestimmungen für Gruppen, Graphen und chemische Verbindungen, Acta Mathematica, vol. 68, 1937, pp. 145–254)
 with Godfrey Harold Hardy: John Edensor Littlewood Inequalities, Cambridge University Press 1934
 Mathematical Methods in Science, MAA, Washington D. C. 1977 (ed. Leon Bowden)
 with Gordon Latta: Complex Variables, Wiley 1974
 with Robert E. Tarjan, Donald R. Woods: Notes on introductory combinatorics, Birkhäuser 1983
 with Jeremy Kilpatrick: The Stanford mathematics problem book: with hints and solutions, New York: Teachers College Press 1974
 with several co-authors: Applied combinatorial mathematics'', Wiley 1964 (ed. Edwin F. Beckenbach)
 with Gábor Szegő: Isoperimetric inequalities in mathematical physics, Princeton, Annals of Mathematical Studies 27, 1951

Articles 

with Ralph P. Boas, Jr.: 

with Norbert Wiener:

See also 
 Integer-valued polynomial
 Laguerre–Pólya class
 Landau–Kolmogorov inequality
 Multivariate Pólya distribution
 Pólya's characterization theorem
 Pólya class
 Pólya conjecture
 Polya distribution
 Pólya enumeration theorem
 Pólya–Vinogradov inequality
 Pólya inequality
 Pólya urn model
 Pólya's theorem
 Pólya's proof that there is no "horse of a different color"
 Wallpaper group
The Martians (scientists)

References

External links 

 The George Pólya Award
 
 
 George Pólya, Gábor Szegö, Problems and theorems in analysis (1998)
 
 George Pólya on UIUC's WikEd
 Memorial Resolution
 
 

1887 births
1985 deaths
20th-century Hungarian mathematicians
Mathematics popularizers
American agnostics
American people of Hungarian-Jewish descent
Hungarian Jews
American statisticians
Hungarian emigrants to Switzerland
Combinatorialists
Academic staff of ETH Zurich
Hungarian agnostics
Hungarian statisticians
Complex analysts
Mathematical analysts
Members of the United States National Academy of Sciences
Mathematicians from Budapest
Swiss emigrants to the United States
Stanford University Department of Mathematics faculty